Suomen huippumalli haussa, Cycle 6 is the sixth season of the Suomen huippumalli haussa series that began to air on 15 March 2017. The judging panel was revamped with Maryam Razavi as the host, and Juri Silvennoinen and Marica Rosengård as co-judges. Additionally, male hopefuls were allowed to apply introducing a co-ed cycle.

The winner of the competition was 20 year old Jerry Koivisto from Hämeenkyrö. He won a modeling contract with Paparazzi models, a Cosmopolitan cover and a flight to New York City for castings. Furthermore he won a diamond from Alexander Tillander.

Cast

Contestants
(Ages stated are at start of contest)

Judges
 Maryam Razavi (host)
 Marica Rosengård
 Juri Silvennoinen

Episodes

Episode 1 
Original airdate: 

This was the casting episode.

Episode 2 
Original airdate: 

First call-out: Jerry Koivisto
Bottom two: Emilia Hölttä & Emilia Ylenius
Eliminated: Emilia Hölttä

Episode 3 
Original airdate: 

First call-out: Sofia Öster
Bottom three: Jesse Halt, Vilja Tuohisto-Kokko & Ville Mäkäräinen
Eliminated: Ville Mäkäräinen

Episode 4 
Original airdate: 
 
First call-out: Juuso Salpakari
Bottom three: Emilia Ylenius, Jesse Halt & Robert Tollet
Eliminated: Emilia Ylenius & Jesse Halt

Episode 5 
Original airdate: 
 
First call-out: Henrik Lyly & Vilja Tuohisto-Kokko
Bottom two: Anniina Sankoh & Juuso Salpakari
Eliminated: Anniina Sankoh

Episode 6 
Original airdate: 
 
Challenge winner: Juuso Salpakari
First call-out: Robert Tollet
Bottom two: Henrik Lyly & Roosa Marttila 
Eliminated: Henrik Lyly

Episode 7 
Original airdate: 
 
Challenge winner: Juuso Salpakari & Robert Tollet
First call-out: Vilja Tuohisto-Kokko
Bottom four: Jerry Koivisto, Robert Tollet, Roosa Marttila & Sofia Öster
Eliminated: Robert Tollet & Roosa Marttila

Episode 8 
Original airdate: 
 
Challenge winner: Vilja Tuohisto-Kokko
First call-out: Sofia Öster
Bottom two: Jerry Koivisto & Juuso Salpakari
Eliminated: None

Episode 9 
Original airdate: 
 
Challenge winner:  Jerry Koivisto
First call-out:  Jerry Koivisto
Bottom three:  Juuso Salpakari, Sofia Öster & Vilja Tuohisto-Kokko
Eliminated: Juuso Salpakari & Vilja Tuohisto-Kokko

Episode 10 
Original airdate: 
 
Final two: Jerry Koivisto & Sofia Öster
Finland's Next Top Model: Jerry Koivisto

Results

Call-out order

 The contestant was eliminated
 The contestant was part of a non-elimination bottom two
 The contestant won the competition

Photo shoot guide 
Episode 1 photo shoot: Cosmopolitan casting shots
Episode 2 commercial: Series launch
Episode 3 photo shoot: Marianne candy advertisements 
Episode 4 photo shoot: Kultajousi jewelry 
Episode 5 photo shoot: Vogue photo shoot in pairs
Episode 6 photo shoot: Labello smiling shots
Episode 7 photo shoot: Westerback catalogue
Episode 8 photo shoot: Biozell campaigns
Episode 9 photo shoot: Wedding couples for Alexander Tillander jewelry
Episode 10 photo shoot: Cosmopolitan covers

References

2017 Finnish television seasons
Suomen huippumalli haussa